The New Guinea hairtail (Demissolinea novaeguineensis) is a species of cutlassfish which is classified in the monotypic genus Demissolinea. It is known only from the type location Dolak Island off southwestern New Guinea.

References

Trichiuridae
Fish described in 2003